The dissociation rate in chemistry, biochemistry, and pharmacology is the rate or speed at which a ligand dissociates from a protein, for instance, a receptor. It is an important factor in the binding affinity and intrinsic activity (efficacy) of a ligand at a receptor. The dissociation rate for a particular substrate can be applied to enzyme kinetics, including the Michaelis-Menten model. Substrate dissociation rate contributes to how large or small the enzyme velocity will be. In the Michaelis-Menten model, the enzyme binds to the substrate yielding an enzyme substrate complex, which can either go backwards by dissociating or go forward by forming a product. The dissociation rate constant is defined using Koff.

The Michaelis-Menten constant is denoted by Km and is represented by the equation Km= (Koff + Kcat)/ Kon. The rates that the enzyme binds and dissociates from the substrate are represented by Kon and Koff respectively. Km is also defined as the substrate concentration at which enzymatic velocity reaches half of its maximal rate. The tighter a ligand binds to a substrate, the lower the dissociation rate will be. Km and Koff are proportional, thus at higher levels of dissociation, the Michaelis-Menten constant will be larger.

References 

Equilibrium chemistry
Enzyme kinetics